The New York Yanks were an American football team that played in the National Football League under that name in the 1950 and 1951 seasons.

Season by season overview

1949

The team began in 1944 as the Boston Yanks, owned by Kate Smith's manager, Ted Collins. He wanted a team in New York City, but had to be content with one in Boston after the New York Giants refused to let his new team share the New York area. 

In 1949, Collins suspected that the All-America Football Conference was on its last legs and got permission to move the Yanks to New York; rather than a formal relocation, however, Collins asked the NFL to fold his Boston franchise and grant him a new one for New York, most likely as a tax write-off. This new team played as the New York Bulldogs and shared the Polo Grounds with the Giants during the 1949 season.

The 1949 Bulldogs were a disaster on the field (1–10–1) as well as the box office, drawing just 48,007 fans to their six home games, with by far the largest crowd (17,704) coming against the Giants. 

The nadir came during a 13-13 tie with the Washington Redskins on October 30, which drew a meagre 3,678 fans, the lowest attendance at a non-neutral site NFL game since 1939 (excluding 2020, when the COVID-19 pandemic severely limited attendance).

1950

In 1950, Collins changed his franchise's name to the New York Yanks and moved to Yankee Stadium, essentially merging the woeful Bulldogs with the New York Yankees of the now-defunct AAFC, as part of a deal in which he bought the rights to most of the Yankees players. (Eighteen players from the '49 Yankees played for the Yanks in 1950, while only four players from the 1949 Bulldogs — Joe Domnanovich, Joe Golding, John Nolan and John Rauch — returned.)

After splitting their first two games, the Yanks went on a five-game winning streak, putting them on top of the NFL's new National Conference with a 6–1 record. Led by quarterback George Ratterman (who the Yanks acquired after his old team, the Buffalo Bills, failed to be accepted in the NFL-AAFC merger), New York rolled up 190 points in those five victories. (Attendance improved as well; after attracting barely 30,000 total to their first three home games (all Yanks victories), 48,642 showed up for their next home game against Chicago, followed by 42,673 against the Rams.) That proved to be the team's high-water mark, however; a porous defense led to a four-game losing streak that knocked the Yanks out of the race. A win over the expiring Baltimore franchise (playing its last game) upped their final record to 7–5, good enough for third place and a definite improvement over 1949.

1951

The football Yanks had two future Hall of Fame linemen in Art Donovan and Mike McCormack in 1951.

Their biggest opponent turned out to be their landlords, the baseball Yankees, who won the American League pennant, and did not want the field torn up during the 1951 World Series.

The Yanks were forced to move their first two home games to Los Angeles and Detroit, both of which were blowout losses. Their next five games resulted in four losses by a total of 16 points and one tie, all but one of which were also played on the road (only four of their 12 games for the season were at home). 

With a 0–6–1 record, the Yanks season was already over, and their attendance crashed in response: their sole home game in that span, a 29–27 loss to Green Bay, drew just 7,351 fans. 

The Yanks finished the 1951 season with only one victory, a 31–28 win in their road game against Green Bay.

The Yanks lost 27–17 to finish their season at 1–9–2 and last place in the league.

Season-by-season record

Yanks Total: 8 - 14 - 2

Decline and dissolution
After only 37,268 people attended their four home games in 1951 (three losses and a tie), the New York Yanks were reported to have been sold back to the league following the season, but it is more likely the franchise was simply cancelled by the NFL. 

Shortly thereafter, a group of Dallas businessmen bought the Yanks' roster and player contracts, though it was ostensibly a new franchise, and moved them to Dallas as the Dallas Texans, playing at the Cotton Bowl. That franchise, in turn, failed after only one season, and the remains were awarded to a Baltimore-based group that used it to start the new Baltimore Colts.

However, the NFL and the current Colts organization (which relocated to Indianapolis in 1984) do not consider the Colts to be a continuation of the New York Yanks or any other franchise.

First round draft selections

Pro Football Hall of Famers

Notable players
Bob DeMoss
Brad Ecklund
George Ratterman 
Jack Russell
Spec Sanders 
George Taliaferro 
Art Weiner
Buddy Young

References 

American football teams established in 1949
American football teams disestablished in 1951
Defunct National Football League teams
Defunct American football teams in New York City
1949 establishments in New York City
1951 disestablishments in New York (state)
Sports in the Bronx